The 2014–15 season was Bengaluru FC's second season in the I-League since its establishment in 2013. This season was the first season that Bengaluru FC competed in Asian competition.

Bengaluru began the season as the defending champions, but could not defend the title as they could manage only a draw in the last game against the winners Mohun Bagan, but the club had the longest unbeaten run (13 games).

In continental cups, they lost in the first round of the 2015 AFC Champions League qualifying play-off and then participated in group stage of the AFC Cup, where they reached Round of 16.

In domestic cups, Bengaluru FC started the season with the 2014 Durand Cup where they lost in semi-finals to Salgaocar on penalties. Bengaluru FC also participated in Federation Cup. They finished the tournament as champions after defeating Dempo in the final 2–1.

22 different players represented the club in five different competitions and there were 13 different goal scorers. Sunil Chhetri was Bengaluru's top scorer with 14 goals in 36 appearances.

Background

Bengaluru FC was unveiled on 21 July 2013 and played their first season in 2013–14. After playing their first ever game against Mohun Bagan on 22 September 2013, Bengaluru FC won the 2013–14 I-League when they defeated Dempo 4–2 on 21 April 2014 and created the history by being the first team to win I-League in its debut year.

In July 2014, Bengaluru signed a deal with Puma as their official kit sponsors from the 2014–15 season. This season Bengaluru also moved from Bangalore Football Stadium to Sree Kanteerava Stadium due to rebuilding of the old stadium for 2017 FIFA U-17 World Cup. As the winner of 2013–14 I-League, Bengaluru competed at Asian competitions, for the first time.

Transfers
Bengaluru FC began signing players for the 2014–15 season as early as April when they signed Tata Football Academy graduate Udanta Singh. Bengaluru FC also released veteran mid-fielder Johnny Menyongar at the end of previous season. Bengaluru FC signed Josh Walker as their marquee player. On 15 July 2014, Bengaluru announced they signed two more players, Eugeneson Lyngdoh and Lalchhuan Mawia. Over the summer, Bengaluru also signed Shillong Lajong goalkeeper Lalthuammawia Ralte.

In

Out

Loan out

Pre-season and friendlies

Bengaluru FC played two friendlies against Salgaocar and Pune in August 2014 at Duler Stadium, Goa. Bengaluru won the first game against Salgaocar through a solo goal from Curtis Osano in the first half. The second friendly against Pune ended in 1–1 draw after Robin Singh scored a goal in the first half. Bengaluru then toured China and Hong Kong for further pre-season friendlies. In the first game of the tour, Bengaluru registered 0–1 win against Guangdong Sunray Cave, courtesy of an 87th-minute goal from Malemngamba Meetei. In the second game against Eastern AA, Bengaluru failed to score a goal and lost 0–2. In the final game of the tour, Bengaluru played Guangzhou R&F and faced another defeat 0–3.

Bengaluru FC also participated in the local tournament, Puttaiah Memorial Cup, which they won by defeating ASC 8–1 in the final.

Competitions

Overall

Last Updated: 31 May 2015
Source : Competitions

Overview

I-League

Summary

January
Bengaluru began the defense of the I-League title on 17 January 2015 against Dempo. Bengaluru had the chance to take the lead when they were awarded a penalty in 44th minute but Sunil Chhetri could not convert to chance. The match eventually ended in a goal-less draw. The next match for Bengaluru FC was worse as they went down to Pune 1–3 in their next home game. Pune took an early 0–2 lead through Darko Nikac and Luciano Sabrosa. Pune furthered their advantage in the 82nd minute when Thongkhosiem Haokip connected well with Yumnam Raju's cross for the ball to bounce beyond the goal-line after rattling the crossbar. In the closing minutes, Bengaluru pulled one back when Eugeneson Lyngdoh scored a goal with the assist from Sean Rooney. In their next game against East Bengal, Bengaluru could not find the back of the net, in spite of dominating in the first half and creating multiple chances. In the second half, Abhinas Ruidas scored a goal for East Bengal against the run of play while Bengaluru continued to miss chances and thus game ended 1–0 in favour of East Bengal and Bengaluru's winless streak was extended to three games. However, Bengaluru finally secured the first win of the season in the away game against newly promoted, and then table toppers, Royal Wahingdoh with a dominant 4–0 win. Thoi Singh scored a brace, while Eugeneson Lyngdoh and C.K. Vineeth scored a goal each.

February
In February, Bengaluru played against newly inducted team from Pune, Bharat FC. The only goal of the match was scored by Eugeneson Lyngdoh in 78th minute as Bengaluru won their second game of the season, 1–0. During their next match against Shillong Lajong, Bengaluru took an early lead when Robin Singh converted the cross from Shankar Sampingiraj with a header. Towards the end of first half Bengaluru were down to 10 men when Curtis Osano was sent-off for a dangerous challenge on Cornell Glenn, but Bengaluru continued to attack and doubled the lead through Thoi Singh's header from a Eugeneson Lyngdoh's cross. That victory meant that Bengaluru won their third consecutive game and rose to second in the I-League table. On 20 February, in the away game against Mohun Bagan, the team started well when Sunil Chhetri scored his first goal of season in the league in 8th minute, but Bengaluru unfolded quickly and conceded 4 goals which included a brace from Sony Norde, owing to blunders from the Bengaluru goalkeeper and poor defense overall. Bengaluru bounced back to win the next game 3–1 against Sporting Clube de Goa with a brace from Sean Rooney and a goal from Beikhokhei Beingaichho, both scoring their first goals in the league.

March
Bengaluru began March with an away game against Mumbai. After persistent attack from both sides, Bengaluru scored first when Eugeneson Lyngdoh curled a shot into the far corner. Mumbai equalized quickly in the second half via Josimar. Bengaluru created chances late in the game, but man of the match, Mumbai goalkeeper Nidhin Lal, saved all the attempts and both teams eventually shared a point. After the mid-season break, Bengaluru played the away game against Salgaocar. The game also marked the return of top players of Bengaluru, who were away for the national duty. Bengaluru enjoyed a lion share of possession, but could not convert any chances in the first half and the game remained goalless. Robin Singh finally broke the deadlock with a pass from Rino Anto. Salgaocar had the chance to equalize when they were awarded penalty, but man of the match Lalthuammawia Ralte, correctly guessed the direction and saved the penalty to secure 3 points for Bengaluru. Bengaluru ended the March on a high note with a convincing 4–1 victory at home against Sporting Clube de Goa. Bengaluru took the lead in the first half when Josh Walker's header converted a pass from Eugeneson Lyngdoh in a goal. Rino Anto, Thoi Singh, and Beikhokhei Beingaichho scored a goal each in the second half. Sporting Goa's multiple attacks, especially from Odafe Onyeka Okolie, were thwarted by man of the match Lalthuammawia Ralte.

April
In April, Bengaluru played the home game against Royal Wahingdoh. The game saw flurry of goals with Robin Singh, Shankar Sampingiraj, Josh Walker countering three goals by the visiting team and the game ended at 3–3. Before the next game against Mumbai, Bengaluru were trailing by 3 points to the table topper Mohun Bagan, in spite of having played 2 more games, so it was a crucial match for Bengaluru to stay in the title hunt, but the game turned out to be 4th consecutive draw between the two sides. In spite of continuous attack by Bengaluru, the first half remained goalless. In the second half, against the run of the play, Rahul Bheke scored the goal for visitors to take the lead in 67th minute. Bengaluru intensified the attack and Robin Singh equalized in the closing minutes before he was sent-off. The next game for Bengaluru was another top of the table clash with Pune F.C. Bengaluru quickly got ahead when Shankar Sampingiraj scored the fastest goal of the season and the second fastest I-League goal of all time, in 15 seconds. Bengaluru doubled the lead just before half-time when C.K. Vineeth scored a goal from Beikhokhei Beingaichho's pass and Bengaluru scored their first ever win against Pune team. In three days, Bengaluru faced another Pune based team Bharat FC. Facing the depleted time, Bengaluru easily won the game 2–0 with goals from Eugeneson Lyngdoh and C.K. Vineeth in each half respectively, with both the assists coming from Sean Rooney.

May

May started with home fixture against East Bengal. Bengaluru had never registered a win against East Bengal in previous five encounters across various tournaments. Though East Bengal started on attacking note, It was Bengaluru who came out on top as Sean Rooney, Sunil Chhetri and Robin Singh scored a goal each and man of the match Lalthuammawia Ralte maintained a clean-sheet in the game and Bengaluru secured its first win against East Bengal. Bengaluru then travelled to Shillong, where a win against Shillong Lajong could put them on the top of the table. After taking the lead towards the end of the first half through Sean Rooney's goal, Bengaluru could not hold on to the lead and conceded a penalty in 65th minute and the game ended in 1–1 draw. After facing defeat against Persipura Jayapura in the AFC cup, Bengaluru returned to form against Salgaocar when they registered 3–1 win. After leading in the first half by 26th-minute goal from Thoi Singh, Bengaluru faced equalizer from Darryl Duffy, but Eugeneson Lyngdoh quickly restored the lead. Man of the match Curtis Osano scored his first goal ever for the team in 80th minute and got on the scoresheet for the victory. In the last away game of the season, Bengaluru played against Dempo. Bengaluru took the lead through Robin Singh's goal, but could not hold on to the lead as Uttam Rai scored one back and the match ended at 1–1 with Bengaluru trailing the table toppers, Mohun Bagan by 2 points. In the final home game against Mohun Bagan, Bengaluru needed an outright win to defend the title. Bengaluru looked on course to defend the title when John Johnson scored his first goal of the season with a header, from Rino Anto's cross, but Mohun Bagan defender Bello Razaq scored the equalizer in 87th minute. Bengaluru's subsequent attack could not find the winner and they conceded the title to Mohun Bagan, though Bengaluru ended the season with the longest unbeaten run of 13 games, equalizing the record set by East Bengal in 2010–11 season.

In spite of being a runner-up, Ashley Westwood maintained that Mohun Bagan hadn't done enough to deserve the league and Bengaluru FC was the best side in the league:

Matches

Table

Results by round

AFC Champions League

In April 2014, it was announced that India will get a playoff spot in the 2015 AFC Champions League. Bengaluru being I-League champions qualified for the tournament. On 11 December 2014, during the AFC Champions League draw, it was announced that Bengaluru would first play in the first round of the East Asia zone qualifiers against 2014 Malaysia Super League winner Johor Darul Ta'zim at the Larkin Stadium.

After goalless first half, Johor Darul Ta'zim immediately scored in the second with a goal from Hariss Harun. Bengaluru were unlucky as they hit the post a couple of times, but couldn't score a goal, but continued the attack. Finally in the closing minutes, Eugeneson Lyngdoh scored a goal directly from the corner and the match went into extra-time. Johor Darul Ta'zim again took the lead when Suppiah Chanturu placed the ball past Bengaluru keeper, Lalthuammawia Ralte. Bengaluru continued to attack, but couldn't find an equalizer and thus were eliminated from the AFC Champions League early. As a result, Bengaluru then contested in 2015 AFC Cup in group E.

AFC Cup

After losing the qualification play-off for the AFC Champions League, Bengaluru were placed into the 2015 AFC Cup group stage. They were placed in Group E with Indonesia Super League runners-up Persipura Jayapura, S.League champions Warriors, and Dhivehi League side Maziya S&RC.

Group stage

Bengaluru started their first ever AFC Cup campaign against Maldivian side Maziya S&RC on 28 February 2015. After a goalless first half, Sunil Chhetri gave Bengaluru FC the lead in the 67th minute. When Bengaluru seemed be heading for the victory towards the end of the match, Maziya were awarded a penalty in 88th minute, which they converted. However, Bengaluru scored a last gasp winner in stoppage time when Shankar Sampingiraj headed the ball into the net from Eugeneson Lyngdoh's cross. In their second game against Persipura Jayapura, Bengaluru started without their top players, Sunil Chhetri, Robin Singh, Shankar Sampingiraj, Keegan Pereira, Eugeneson Lyngdoh and Siam Hanghal, due to a schedule conflict with World Cup qualification. Persipura took a decisive lead of 2–0 in the first half against a lackluster Bengaluru FC side. Persipura extended their lead in the second half, though in the closing minutes C.K. Vineeth pulled one back for Bengaluru as they lost 3–1. Still missing their top players, Bengaluru played the next game at home against Warriors FC. Bengaluru got a penalty in the first half, when C.K. Vineeth was brought down inside the box. English mid-fielder Josh Walker stepped up to take the penalty and scored his first ever goal for the team.

Bengaluru began the reverse leg with an away game against Warriors FC at Singapore. While the first half saw missed chances, Robin Singh scored the decisive goal in 76th minute and the visitors secured 1–0 win. Bengaluru, needing only one point to advance to the next stage, visited Maziya S&RC for the fifth game. After trailing in 62nd minute, Bengaluru quickly equalized in 71st minute via a penalty, taken by Sunil Chhetri. Chhetri went on to score a brace and secure 1–2 win for Bengaluru and confirming a place in pre-quarters. In the final game of the group stage, Bengaluru faced Persipura Jayapura at home. Bengaluru took the lead in 24th minute with a goal from Udanta Singh, but Persipura quickly equalized 6 minutes later. Persipura continued to enjoy the possession in the second half and scored two goals in the last quarter and won the game 1–3. The loss ended Bengaluru's unbeaten streak of 12 matches, across all tournaments, which incidentally began after the loss against Persipura in the reverse leg on 10 March 2015.

Knockout stage

After finishing as the runner-up in group E, Bengaluru played against Group G winner, South China in a single-legged tie in round of 16 at Mong Kok Stadium, Hong Kong. Bengaluru faced an early setback in 26th minute when the referee awarded penalty to South China for Curtis Osano's seemingly legitimate challenge against Daniel McBreen. McBreen converted the penalty to take 1–0 lead for his side. South China doubled their lead in 58th minute when McBreen completed his brace with a cross from Che Runqiu. Thus Bengaluru's first ever AFC cup campaign ended at Round of 16.

Federation cup

Bengaluru participated in Federation Cup for the second time in their history and were placed in Group B, along with Mohun Bagan, Pune, Salgaocar and Shillong Lajong.

In the opening game of group stage, against Salgaocar, Bengaluru took the lead when Sunil Chhetri converted the penalty in 25th minute, but Salgaocar quickly equalized in 33rd minute. Chhetri again took the lead for Bengaluru when he converted a pass from Beikhokhei Beingaichho to a goal, but the Goan outfit again equalized in the 41st minute through a goal from Douhou Pierre. Just before the end of the first half, Sean Rooney scored the winner in 45th minute. In the second match against Mohun Bagan, both the teams had chances, but none of them could convert and the game ended in a 0–0 draw. Against Shillong Lajong, after a goal-less first half, Robin Singh, subbed-in at the half time and scored a 50th-minute winner. In the last group stage game against Pune, Chhetri scored a brace in the closing minutes of the first half. Pune pulled one back in the second half as Thongkhosiem Haokip scored in 87th minute, but ultimately Bengaluru won the encounter 1–2 and entered the semi-finals unbeaten and as the group winner.

On 9 January 2015, Bengaluru FC played their semi-final match against Goan club Sporting Goa. Sean Rooney gave Bengaluru FC the lead in the 28th minute with India captain Sunil Chhetri joining him on the scoresheet ten minutes later with another wonderful strike from a narrow angle. Late into the second half, Eugeneson Lyngdoh scored a late goal to make it 3–0 to Bengaluru and thus advance them to the final.

On 11 January 2015, Bengaluru FC played the final against Goan side Dempo. Bengaluru won the final 2–1 with goals scored by Sunil Chhetri and Robin Singh while the Dempo goal came from a penalty strike by Tolgay Özbey. This was the first time Bengaluru FC won the tournament. With 6 goals, Sunil Chhetri was the joint top-scorer of tournament. As the winner, Bengaluru FC are also guaranteed a play-off round spot in 2016 AFC Cup.

Group stage
Group B

Semi-finals

Final

Durand cup

Bengaluru FC participated in the Durand Cup for the first time in their history and were placed in Group C, along with Mohammedan and SESA Football Academy.

In the first game against Mohammedan, Bengaluru FC led 2–0 at halftime with goals scored by skipper Sunil Chhetri in the 6th minute and Eugeneson Lyngdoh in the 38th minute. Alfred Jaryan scored one goal for Mohammedan in 68th minute, but Bengaluru FC held on to the lead and won their first match in the tournament. In the dramatic second game against SESA Football Academy, Bengaluru FC took lead in 66th minute when Sunil Chhetri was awarded a penalty, but Angelo Colaco and Melwyn Fernandes scored two goals in 79th minute and 92nd minute to get SESA a 1–2 lead. In the closing minutes though, Melwyn Fernandes was sent-off for pulling down John Johnson and Bengaluru FC were awarded another penalty. Sunil Chhetri scored the penalty and Bengaluru FC were through to semi-finals having scored one more goal than SESA, points and goal difference being same for both the teams.

In the semi-finals, Bengaluru faced Group A winner Salgaocar. Both sides failed to score in the regular time and extra-time. In the penalty shoot-out, Sunil Chhetri missed the second penalty and Bengaluru's Durand Cup campaign ended after losing 5–4 in the penalty shoot-out. Salgaocar went on to win the trophy.

Quarter-finals

Group C

Semi-finals

Accolades
Eugeneson Lyngdoh was awarded Best midfielder of I-League for 2014–15 in All India Football Federation awards.

Player information

Squad information

Management

As of December 2014.

Player statistics

Appearances and goals

Updated: 31 May 2015

Top scorers

Source: soccerway
Updated: 31 May 2015

Clean sheets

Source: soccerway
Updated: 31 May 2015

Disciplinary record

Source: soccerway
Updated: 31 May 2015

International caps
Players called for senior international duty during the 2014–15 season while under contract with Bengaluru FC.

See also
 2014–15 in Indian football

References

Bengaluru FC
Bengaluru FC seasons
2010s in Bangalore